Pârjoale (also called Moldavian Pârjoale), plural form of pârjoală, are Romanian and Moldovan meatballs, usually minced pork and beef (sometimes lamb or chicken) mixed with eggs, grated potatoes, slices of bread soaked in milk or water, chopped onions, herbs (parsley, dill, thyme), spices (pepper) and salt, homogenized to form balls which are flattened to an elongated shape, passed through bread crumbs, and fried in hot oil. 
They can also be marinated in a tomato sauce.

See also 
 Chiftele
 Perișoare
 Mititei
 Dry meatballs

Notes and references 

Romanian breaded dishes
Moldovan cuisine

ro:Pârjoale moldovenești